"Lift Me Up" is a promo single from singer-songwriter Kate Voegele's second studio album, A Fine Mess. This single, and the rest of her album, was produced by Mike Elizondo, who has worked with the likes of Pink and Maroon 5. The song was included in 2008 on the 2008 Beijing Olympic Games soundtrack, sponsored by AT&T.

Track listing
Digital download
 "Lift Me Up" – 4:33

Charts
AT&T version

New edit version

References

2008 singles